The 1946 Texas College Steers football team was an American football team that represented Texas College in the Southwestern Athletic Conference (SWAC) during the 1946 college football season. In their fifth season under head coach Alexander Durley, the team compiled a 5–4–1 record (3–3 against SWAC opponents) and outscored opponents by a total of 183 to 85.

In December 1946, The Pittsburgh Courier applied the Dickinson System to the black college teams and rated Texas College at No. 13.

The team played its home games at Steer Stadium in Tyler, Texas.

Schedule

References

Texas College
Texas College Steers football seasons
Texas College Steers football